Ciucaș Peak is the highest peak of Ciucaș Mountains, Southern Carpathians.

References

External links
 Pictures and images from the Carpathian Mountains
Alpinet 
Itinerar.ro 

Mountains of Romania
Mountains of the Southern Carpathians
Geography of Brașov County